Palatica is a village in the municipality of Želino, North Macedonia.

Demographics
As of the 2021 census, Palatica had 1,432 residents with the following ethnic composition:
Albanians 1,351
Persons for whom data are taken from administrative sources 81

According to the 2002 census, the village had a total of 2,516 inhabitants. Ethnic groups in the village include:
Albanians 2,501
Macedonians 6
Turks 1
Others 8

References

External links

Villages in Želino Municipality
Albanian communities in North Macedonia